Kornél Csernik (born 2 July 1998) is a Hungarian football player who plays for Haladás.

Career

Ferencváros
On 13 August 2016, Csernik played his first match for Ferencváros in a 1-2 loss against Vasas in the Hungarian League.

Club statistics

Updated to games played as of 16 December 2018.

References

External links
Profile at HLSZ 
Profile at Fradi.hu 

1998 births
Living people
Footballers from Budapest
Hungarian footballers
Hungary youth international footballers
Hungary under-21 international footballers
Association football midfielders
Ferencvárosi TC footballers
Soroksár SC players
Szombathelyi Haladás footballers
Nemzeti Bajnokság I players
Nemzeti Bajnokság II players
21st-century Hungarian people